U.S. Route 45 (US 45) is a major north-south United States highway and a border-to-border route, from Lake Superior to the Gulf of Mexico.

US 45 is notable for incorporating, in its maiden alignment, the first paved road in the South, a 49-mile segment in Lee County, Mississippi. Let to contract in July 1914, the concrete highway opened on November 15, 1915.

As of 2006, the highway's northern terminus is in Ontonagon, Michigan, at the corner of Ontonagon and River Streets, a few blocks from Lake Superior (M-64 formerly terminated there as well until its rerouting in October 2006 to use the newly built Ontonagon River Bridge).  US 45's southern terminus is in Mobile, Alabama, at an intersection with U.S. Route 98.

Route description

Alabama 

US 45 is concurrent with unsigned SR 17 between Mobile and Vinegar Bend, just north of Deer Park, in Washington County, Alabama. From Vinegar Bend to the Mississippi state line, US 45 is concurrent with unsigned SR 57.

Mississippi 

U.S. Highway 45 is part of a designated hurricane evacuation route in Mississippi.  It is entirely four-laned from its point of entry from Alabama, at the town of State Line, to the Tennessee line just north of Corinth, along the way serving the towns of (from south to north) Waynesboro, Meridian, Columbus and Tupelo.

At Brooksville, U.S. 45 splits away from U.S. 45 Alternate and serves the towns of Columbus and Aberdeen before rejoining U.S. 45 Alternate south of Tupelo. The alternate roadway provides a more direct and entirely four-laned route between Meridian and Tupelo, bypassing Columbus to the west and, more closely, Starkville to the east.

Major junctions of U.S. 45 in Mississippi include U.S. Route 84 at Waynesboro, Interstate 20/59 at Meridian, U.S. Route 82 at Columbus, Interstate 22/U.S. Route 78 at Tupelo and U.S. Route 72 at Corinth.  Each of these junctions is an interchange and, with the exception of Waynesboro, each is part of a freeway segment.

The Mississippi section of U.S. 45 is defined at Mississippi Code Annotated § 65-3-3.

Tennessee

Southern section

From the Mississippi state line, US 45 extends north past the cities of Guys, Eastview, Selmer, Bethel Springs, Finger, Henderson, Pinson, and Jackson to Three Way, where the highway splits into US 45W and US 45E.

U.S. Route 45W

US 45W is a  state highway in West Tennessee, connecting Jackson with South Fulton via Humboldt, Trenton, Dyer, Rutherford, Kenton, and Union City. For the majority of its length, it is concurrent with unsigned State Route 5 (SR 5).

U.S. Route 45E

US 45E  is a  state highway in West Tennessee, connecting Jackson with South Fulton via Medina, Milan, Bradford, Greenfield, Sharon, and Martin. For the majority of its length, it is concurrent with unsigned State Route 43 (SR 43) for most of the route's length except for short segments at Martin and South Fulton, where it is cosigned with SR 216 and SR 215 respectively.

Northern section

Mainline US 45, concurrent with unsigned SR 3, goes northeast and passes through neighborhoods in South Fulton along Chickasaw Drive before turning north onto Highland Drive at an intersection with Kentucky Route 116 (KY 116/W State Line Street) at the western edge of downtown. US 45 then crosses into Kentucky and the city of Fulton.

Kentucky 

U.S. 45 enters Kentucky at Fulton then northeast past Mayfield then heads directly north into Paducah as a four-lane highway. In Paducah, U.S. 45 serves as a major artery, intersecting with Interstate 24 at exit 7, and intersecting US 60 and 62. U.S. 45 leaves Kentucky from Paducah's northern border across the two-lane, metal-grate Brookport Bridge to Brookport, Illinois across the Ohio River.

Illinois 

In the state of Illinois, U.S. 45 runs from a bridge across the Ohio River from Paducah, Kentucky, through Shawnee National Forest and north to the Wisconsin border east of Antioch, Illinois.

In its progress north from the Ohio River U.S. 45 first joins Interstate 24 as far as Vienna then heads northeast through Harrisburg and Eldorado in Saline County and north through Fairfield, Flora, Effingham, Mattoon, Champaign, Urbana, Gilman and Kankakee, then straight north through the western suburbs of Chicago in Will County, Cook County and Lake County to the Wisconsin border.

Wisconsin 

U.S. 45 enters the state in southeast Wisconsin. It runs concurrent with Interstate 894 and U.S. Route 41 through the west side of metro Milwaukee to form a major artery through the metropolitan area. It runs north to Fond du Lac. The highway routes near the western shore of Lake Winnebago through Oshkosh, Wisconsin. U.S. 45 then travels north through Wittenberg, Antigo, and Eagle River, as well as the state and national forests, until it leaves the state at Land O' Lakes and enters Michigan.

Michigan 

US 45 enters Michigan south of Watersmeet. From there, the highway crosses the Western Upper Peninsula through the Ottawa National Forest running north to Ontonagon. US 45 ends just south of Lake Superior in downtown Ontonagon.

History 

Until March 1935, US 45's northern terminus was at US 12 in Des Plaines, Illinois near Chicago.

Prior to the construction of the Interstate Highway system, US 45 was one of the main routes south out of Chicago toward New Orleans, Louisiana. Much of the traffic left US 45 at Effingham, Illinois, continuing on through Cairo, Illinois along Illinois Route 37.

Major intersections 
Southern segment
Alabama
  in Mobile
  in Prichard
Mississippi
  in Waynesboro
  in Meridian
  in Meridian
  west of Columbus. The highways travel concurrently to Columbus.
  north-northwest of New Wren. The highways travel concurrently to the Verona–Tupelo city line.
  in Tupelo
  in Corinth
Tennessee
  in Selmer. The highways travel concurrently through the city.
  in Jackson
  in Three Way
  in Milan
  in Humboldt

Northern segment
Tennessee
  in South Fulton. US 45 / US 51 travel concurrently to Fulton, Kentucky.
Kentucky
  north of Mayfield
  in Paducah
  in Paducah. The highways travel concurrently through the city.
  in Paducah. US 45/US 60 travels concurrently through the city.
Illinois
  in Metropolis
  north-northeast of Vienna
  north of Mill Shoals
  east of Flora. The highways travel concurrently to northwest of Flora.
  in Effingham. The highways travel concurrently through the city.
  in Effingham
  northeast of Neoga
  in Mattoon
  in Tuscola Township
  in Pesotum
  in Champaign. The highways travel concurrently to Urbana.
  in Urbana
  in Rantoul
  in Gilman. The highways travel concurrently through the city.
  east of Ashkum. The highways travel concurrently to Peotone Township.
  in Kankakee
  in Frankfort
  on the Mokena–Orland Park–Tinley Park city line
  in Orland Park
  west of the Palos Hills–Hickory Hills city line. US 12/US 45 travels concurrently to Des Plaines. US 20/US 45 travels concurrently to the Stone Park–Melrose Park city line.
  in Willow Springs
  on the Countryside–Hodgkins city line
  in La Grange
  on the Westchester–Hillside–Bellwood city line
  west of Rosemont
  in Des Plaines
Wisconsin
  in Greenfield. The highways are concurrent for a 1/2 mile.
  in Greenfield. I-41 and US-41 stay concurrent until Richfield. I-894 stays concurrent to the Milwaukee-Wauwatosa city line.
  in Milwaukee.
  in Wauwatosa.
  in the Town of Fond du Lac
  in Oshkosh
  in Winchester. The highways travel concurrently for 3 miles.
  in Monico. The highways travel concurrently through the town.
Michigan
  in Watersmeet
 River Street/Chippewa Street in Ontonagon

See also 

U.S. Route 45 Business in Wittenburg, Wisconsin
U.S. Route 45 Business in New London, Wisconsin
U.S. Route 45 Business in Paducah, Kentucky
U.S. Route 45 Bypass in Jackson, Tennessee
U.S. Route 45W Business in Trenton, Tennessee; decommissioned and re-signed as State Route 367
U.S. Route 45W Business in Humboldt, Tennessee
U.S. Route 45E Business in Martin, Tennessee
U.S. Route 45 Business in Tupelo, Mississippi
U.S. Route 45 Alternate in Brooksville, Mississippi and Shannon, Mississippi

References

External links 

 Endpoints of US 45

 
45
45